Gyula Hajszán (born 9 October 1961, in Sopron) is a retired Hungarian football player.

He made his debut for the Hungarian national team in 1982, and got 37 caps and 4 goals until 1994. He was a participant at the 1986 FIFA World Cup in Mexico, where Hungary failed to progress from the group stage.

National team statistics

References

External links 
 

1961 births
Living people
People from Sopron
Hungarian footballers
Hungary international footballers
1986 FIFA World Cup players
Association football midfielders
2. Bundesliga players
Szombathelyi Haladás footballers
Győri ETO FC players
MSV Duisburg players
Tennis Borussia Berlin players
Hungarian expatriate footballers
Expatriate footballers in Germany
Hungarian expatriate sportspeople in Germany
Sportspeople from Győr-Moson-Sopron County